Boops (from Greek , literally 'cow-eye') is a genus of ray-finned saltwater fishes. The genus contains two species, B. boops and B. lineatus. Sarpa salpa was once assigned to Boops.

References

Sciaenidae
Marine fish genera
Taxa named by Georges Cuvier
Fish of the Mediterranean Sea